Hanna Elise Marcussen (born 4 September 1977) is a Norwegian politician for the Green Party. She currently serves as Oslo’s City Commissioner for Urban Development.

Career
She served as national spokesperson for the Norwegian Green Party in the years 2008–2014. She was also elected as a deputy member of Oslo city council in 2011 and 2015.

In November 2012, she lost a fight against Rasmus Hansson for the top spot on the party's ballot for the  2013 Norwegian parliamentary election. She instead got the top spot on the party's ballot in Rogaland in February, 2013. Hansson was elected in Oslo, and Marcussen failed to win a Rogaland seat.

From 2014 to 2015, she was the manager of Bergfald Environmental Advisors.

In 2015, however, she was appointed as the City Commissioner of Urban Planning in the new city government of Raymond Johansen. 

Following Lan Marie Berg’s resignation following a confidence vote against her, Marcussen succeeded her in an interim capacity as commissioner for transport and the environment, before the new cabinet was presented on 24 June 2021. Marcussen was then succeeded by Sirin Hellvin Stav.

Education

Marcussen is a qualified archaeologist from the University of Oslo.

References

External resources

Green Party (homesite)

1977 births
Living people
Politicians from Oslo
Green Party (Norway) politicians
Norwegian environmentalists
Norwegian women environmentalists
University of Oslo alumni